Boris Malagurski (born 11 August 1988) is a Serbian-Canadian film director, producer, writer, political commentator, television host, and activist. His films include the documentary series The Weight of Chains.

Early life and education

Born to Branislav Malagurski and Slavica Malagurski, Boris grew up in the northern Serbian town of Subotica. In an interview for Literární noviny, Prague's cultural and political journal, Malagurski said that his last name originates from the Polish town of Mała Góra.

Malagurski emigrated to Canada in 2005 and made a documentary film about his move from Serbia called The Canada Project. Excerpts from the film were shown on Serbian National Television, as a part of Mira Adanja-Polak's TV show. Since then, Malagurski identifies himself as Serbian-Canadian. While studying Film Production at the University of British Columbia, Malagurski organized protests in Vancouver against Kosovo's declaration of independence and received help from Canadian journalist Scott Taylor and Irish diplomat Mary Walsh in making his film about Kosovo. Malagurski became a Canadian citizen and remained in Canada until 2011, when he returned to work in Serbia.

Malagurski attended Kitsilano Secondary School in Kitsilano neighbourhood of Vancouver, British Columbia. Malagurski earned his bachelor's degree in film production from the University of British Columbia. In July 2019, he earned his master's degree in film from the Staffordshire University.

Career
In 2010, the newspaper Politika described Malagurski as the "Serbian Michael Moore", though Malagurski himself had spoken of his use of "Michael Moore post-production techniques", earlier in the same year.

Film

Kosovo: Can You Imagine?
In 2009, Malagurski released Kosovo: Can You Imagine?, a documentary film about the plight of Serb communities living in Kosovo at that time. Former Canadian general Lewis MacKenzie, Canadian former diplomat James Byron Bissett, former UNMIK officer John Hawthorne and economist Michel Chossudovsky are interviewed in the film.

The Weight of Chains
In 2010, Malagurski released The Weight of Chains, his documentary film analyzing the role that the United States, the European Union, and the NATO alliance as a whole allegedly played in the breakup of Yugoslavia. The film features interviews with James Byron Bissett, John Bosnitch, Michel Chossudovsky, Vlade Divac, Branislav Lečić, Veran Matić, John Perkins, general Lewis MacKenzie and others. The film was shown in cinemas in Australia, Canada, the United States and Serbia, also at the festivals listed below, and on Eurochannel TV networks. In December 2018, the film was added to the film and video catalog of the Library of United States Congress.

The Presumption of Justice
Malagurski co-directed (with Ivana Rajović), The Presumption of Justice in 2012, a documentary dealing with the September 2009 death of Brice Taton, a fan of Toulouse FC, and alleged inconsistencies in the subsequent court case in Serbia. The film had its broadcasting premiere in April 2013 as a part of Malagurski's TV show on Happy TV which also featured an interview with a man who claimed to have witnessed the event, but who had not been called to testify.

Belgrade
 Malagurski's next film Belgrade, (also known as Belgrade with Boris Malagurski), a documentary about Belgrade, the capital of Serbia had its world premiere on 19 October 2013 at Sava Centar in Belgrade and was aired on Radio Television Serbia (RTS) on 20 October 2014. The film features interviews with several prominent Belgraders, including tennis player Novak Djokovic.

The Weight of Chains 2
The Weight of Chains 2 was released in 2014 as a part of the Serbian Film Festival at Montecasino in Johannesburg, South Africa. It features interviews with Noam Chomsky, Carla Del Ponte, Mlađan Dinkić, Vuk Jeremić, Ivo Josipović, Slavko Kulić, Miroslav Lazanski, Michael Parenti, Oliver Stone, R. James Woolsey and others. The film discusses the effects of neoliberal reforms on all aspects of life in the former Yugoslavia, from politics, economics, military, culture and education to the media. Festival screenings include Raindance Film Festival and the Subversive Festival and others listed below, and it was broadcast by RTS.

Kosovo: A Moment in Civilization
In September 2017, Malagurski released a documentary film about Serbian monasteries in Kosovo called Kosovo: A Moment In Civilization, designed to oppose Kosovo's membership in UNESCO. The film was released on September 15, 2017 in Paris, France. The film was condemned by Kosovo's government.

Like Me a Million
Malagurski directed and produced a Serbian short film Lajkuj me milion puta. It stars Nikola Kojo, Miloš Biković and Maja Šuša. The film was released on March 29, 2019 at the 66th Belgrade Documentary and Short Film Festival.

The Weight of Chains 3
Malagurski made the third part of The Weight of Chains film series which deals with how big business and political interest groups endanger peoples' health and very existence. The film was released in Chicago on September 28, 2019, and features interviews with Jeffrey Sachs, Katrin Jakobsdottir, Noam Chomsky, Nele Karajlić and Danica Grujičić.

Montenegro: A Land Divided
In December 2019, Malagurski announced that he would produce and direct a documentary film about the 2019 crisis in Montenegro. The announcement came following clerical protests in Montenegro. In November 2020, the official film trailer was released, featuring interviews with Amfilohije Radović, Zdravko Krivokapić, Matija Bećković and others. The film had its world premiere in Belgrade in May 2021.

Srpska: The Struggle for Freedom
Malagurski directed the feature documentary film that chronicles the history of Serbs who live West of the Drina river, including an interview with Serbian film director Emir Kusturica. The film was financed by the city of Banja Luka and other municipalites in Republika Srpska, as well as by individual donors, and premiered in Banja Luka in October 2022. There were calls for screenings to be cancelled in several European countries.

Television
From 2013 to 2015, Malagurski hosted Revolution, a weekly TV show on Happy TV. The show, featured documentary segments and interviews with state officials, foreign and local experts and ordinary citizens of Serbia. During the 2014 Southeast Europe floods, Malagurski reported for Happy TV from several flooded areas in Serbia. The show was cancelled in January 2015. Malagurski alleged that Happy TV gave no official reason for the show's cancellation. 

From 2015 to 2017, Malagurski worked as the executive producer and host of a TV show, Globally, on BN TV, which deals with "global topics from a domestic perspective."

From May 2017 to December 2018, Malagurski was the editor and host of a clip show for the Sputnik Serbia news agency, and the editor and host of a clip show, ClipaRT with Boris Malagurski, for the Russian state-funded RT Documentary channel, dealing with global issues. From April 2019 to September 2020, Malagurski hosted and edited a clip show, known as the Malagurski Ukratko, for the Slobodna Television channel, dealing with domestic issues. From 2020 to 2022, he worked with RT on a clip show titled Big Stories & Beyond with Boris Malagurski.

Malagurski has also appeared on RT, to comment on Balkan topics. In 2020, he was described as "one of Sputnik’s YouTube stars popular with young people".

Journalism
Malagurski has written articles for the Politika daily newspaper and a political magazine New Serbian political thought.

Political views
Malagurski is a Eurosceptic, believing that "chasing the EU is like going on a blind date, you don't know what will happen, but you still want to go because you are desperate."

In an interview for Marin Marinković's talk show One On One on Alternativna TV, Malagurski identified as left-leaning and, in an article in Danas, denounced attempts by some to label him as "extremely right-wing", noting that his films were screened on leftist festivals such as the Subversive Festival in Croatia, that worldwide screenings were organized with the help of leftist parties such as the Left-Green Movement in Iceland and that he was compared to Michael Moore and even Karl Marx in the Slovenian Delo newspaper. Malagurski described these attempts as "Balkan self-declared leftists and civic elitists wanting to hold on to their monopoly of views that are allowed in that ideological sphere", adding that "if anyone dares to criticize the European Union as a bureaucratic elite dictatorship in Brussels, NATO as the army of America's corporate interests and the local NGO sector that deals with politics and receives money from abroad as agents of foreign interests, one can only be labelled as a "right-winger" or whatever sounds more gruesome to uninformed audiences."

Malagurski "supports protests as a form of pressure on governments" and that "elections are important, but democracy works only if we create the conditions under which any elected official will have to make decisions". Malagurski believes that "every government makes decisions in favor of the people only when in fear of the public reaction". As a critic of neoliberalism, Malagurski believes that "resistance to neoliberalism is no longer a matter of ideology, but of common sense", and he advocates the inclusion of young people in politics, noting that most people in Serbia who share similar problems are not united and can't recognize their common interest.

Malagurski was interviewed for Amir Zukić's talk show Pressing on N1 in which he expressed his condemnation of United States foreign policies, noting that "what the United States are doing to Muslims is far more deceitful than what the Nazis did to the Jews, because the Americans are telling Muslims that everything they do is for their own good." According to Malagurski, this shows how well developed the Western propaganda machine is, adding that "Joseph Goebbels would be fascinated by what the West has achieved." On the topic of relations between states and peoples in the Southeastern Europe, Malagurski also stated that "people in the Balkans need reconciliation, and to talk about what brings us together".

Malagurski has also expressed views on Croatian politics, adding his support for Ivan Pernar and the populist Human Shield political party and Macedonian politics, arguing that "the West has made Macedonia an extremely vulnerable and divided country, and that as such it needs a miracle to survive, unfortunately."

Malagurksi believes that the 2018 Douma chemical attack in Syria was staged.

Activism
In October 2011, Malagurski showed his film The Weight of Chains at the Jarinje barricades on the Kosovo-Serbia border, which he said was a show of support for the Serbs fighting for their rights in the disputed province.

In June 2012, Malagurski took part in a protest in front of the Radio Television Serbia building, that called for an end to "organized media darkness" in Serbia and requested the airing of Malagurski's film The Weight of Chains on Serbia's public broadcaster. In front of 200 protesters, Malagurski said that Aleksandar Tijanić, the director of RTS, had told him that despite positive reviews, The Weight of Chains couldn't be aired on RTS because it had already been aired on Happy TV, Malagurski claimed only clips had been shown, which he corroborated with documents from Happy TV. Malagurski also claimed that "Serbia is the only country in the region and in almost all of Europe, where The Weight of Chains has not been shown by the national public broadcaster".

Malagurski has given speeches about Balkan political issues, specifically, on the future status of Kosovo. These include student and public forums at the University of Belgrade and elsewhere.

Academic Jasmin Mujanović has described him as one of the commentators who "peddle 'Russian-themed' disinformation", used in Russian state influence campaigns in the Balkans. The Kosovar Centre for Security Studies has described him as one of the "prominent individuals that actively promote and shape far-right extremist narratives against Kosovo".

Controversies

Threats controversy
In September 2012, Malagurski and Ivana Rajović (co-director), filed a criminal investigation request at Belgrade public prosecutor's office against 12 members of an internet message board for alleged "organized threats to their life and personal and professional safety", made on the message board after the premiere of The Presumption of Justice. Three of the 12 were charged and found guilty in March 2014 at the trial court in Belgrade, each was sentenced to a year in prison, suspended for 3 years of probation. Malagurski's actions and the court's decisions were criticised by Milica Jovanović, and Dario Hajrić writing in Peščanik, and Jovana Gligorijević, writing in Vreme.

Malagurski replied in responses published by Vreme in March 2014 and by NSPM in April 2014. Historian Čedomir Antić criticised Malagurski's accusers in an op-ed in Politika.

Kostić allegations
In January 2013, after an interview for Malagurski's TV show Revolution with Vesna Kostić of the World Bank office in Belgrade was broadcast, Kostić complained that Malagurski had "forged" a conversation in the broadcast. Malagurski denied the claims, adding that Ms. Kostic "forgot how she answered the questions".

Personal life 
Malagurski and his wife Ivana have a son Mateo, born in 2019.

Malagurski is the owner and CEO of Malagurski Cinema, a film production company.

Filmography

Short films
The Canada Project (2005)
Kosovo: Can You Imagine? (2009)
Like Me a Million (2019)

Television
Malagurski has hosted the following TV programmes:

Festival screenings
2005, The Canada Project and Vreme Je in 'Young European Filmmakers' at the Palić Film Festival in Palić, Serbia
2009, Silver Palm Award (one of 14 films awarded in the Student Film category) for Kosovo: Can You Imagine? at the Mexico International Film Festival, Rosarito, Mexico.
2009, Kosovo: Can You Imagine? at the BridgeFest International Film Festival, East Sarajevo, Bosnia-Herzegovina
2011, The Weight of Chains at the International Festival of New Latin American Cinema, Havana, Cuba
2011, The Weight of Chains at the Moving Images Film Festival, Toronto, Ontario, Canada
2011, The Weight of Chains at the BELDOCS International Feature Documentary Film Festival, Belgrade, Serbia. Also, as part of 'Beldocs eho', in Novi Sad, Zrenjanin, Kragujevac, Niš, Vršac and Aleksinac, Serbia.
2011, The Weight of Chains in 'Balkan Cinema Strand' at the Raindance Film Festival, London, United Kingdom
2013, Belgrade at the Serbian Film Festival at Montecasino in Johannesburg, South Africa
2014, The Weight of Chains at the Balkan New Film Festival in Oslo, Norway
2014, The Weight of Chains 2 at the Serbian Film Festival at Montecasino in Johannesburg, South Africa
2015, The Weight of Chains 2 at the Balkan New Film Festival in Oslo, Norway
2015 The Weight of Chains 2 at the Subversive Festival in Zagreb, Croatia
2015, The Weight of Chains 2 at the Raindance Film Festival in London, United Kingdom
2019, Like Me a Million at the Belgrade Documentary and Short Film Festival.
2020, The Weight of Chains 3 at the Belgrade DOK Film Festival.

References

External links 

Official website of Malagurski Cinema
Boris Malagurski at biografija.org

1988 births
Living people
Alumni of Staffordshire University
Canadian documentary film directors
Canadian film executives
Canadian political commentators
Canadian people of Serbian descent
Naturalized citizens of Canada
Film people from Subotica
RT (TV network) people
Serbian documentary filmmakers
Serbian emigrants to Canada
Serbian film directors
Serbian film producers
Serbian television presenters
Serbian political commentators
University of British Columbia alumni